General elections were held in the Faroe Islands on 7 November 1978. The Social Democratic Party and the Union Party emerged as the largest parties, each winning eight of the 32 seats in the Løgting. Two of the 32 elected members were women, and this was the first time ever that women were elected members of the Løgting. The women were Karin Kjølbro (Republican Party) and Jona Henriksen (Social Democratic Party), both from South Streymoy.

Results

References

Faroe Islands
1978 in the Faroe Islands
Elections in the Faroe Islands
November 1978 events in Europe
Election and referendum articles with incomplete results